Paeroa is a town in the Hauraki District of the Waikato Region in the North Island of New Zealand. Located at the base of the Coromandel Peninsula, it is close to the junction of the Waihou River and Ohinemuri River, and is approximately 20 kilometres (12.4 miles) south of the Firth of Thames. 

New Zealanders know the town for its mineral springs, which in the past provided the water used in a local soft drink, "Lemon & Paeroa".

The town stands at the intersection of  State Highways 2 and  26, and is the central service location for the Hauraki District. The town is about half way between Auckland and Tauranga, and acts as the southern gateway to the Coromandel Peninsula, and as the western gateway to the Karangahake Gorge and the Bay of Plenty.

Etymology 
One can gloss the  Māori-language name Paeroa as composed of pae (ridge) and roa (long).

Demographics

Paeroa had a population of 4,269 at the 2018 New Zealand census, an increase of 471 people (12.4%) since the 2013 census, and an increase of 378 people (9.7%) since the 2006 census. There were 1,713 households, comprising 2,046 males and 2,223 females, giving a sex ratio of 0.92 males per female. The median age was 49.8 years (compared with 37.4 years nationally), with 723 people (16.9%) aged under 15 years, 636 (14.9%) aged 15 to 29, 1,641 (38.4%) aged 30 to 64, and 1,266 (29.7%) aged 65 or older.

Ethnicities were 75.9% European/Pākehā, 30.9% Māori, 3.9% Pacific peoples, 4.1% Asian, and 1.2% other ethnicities. People may identify with more than one ethnicity.

The percentage of people born overseas was 12.3, compared with 27.1% nationally.

Although some people chose not to answer the census's question about religious affiliation, 49.4% had no religion, 36.3% were Christian, 2.9% had Māori religious beliefs, 0.4% were Hindu, 0.1% were Muslim, 0.6% were Buddhist and 1.8% had other religions.

Of those at least 15 years old, 300 (8.5%) people had a bachelor's or higher degree, and 1,125 (31.7%) people had no formal qualifications. The median income was $22,200, compared with $31,800 nationally. 243 people (6.9%) earned over $70,000 compared to 17.2% nationally. The employment status of those at least 15 was that 1,251 (35.3%) people were employed full-time, 450 (12.7%) were part-time, and 186 (5.2%) were unemployed.

Rural surrounds

Paeroa Rural had a population of 1,845 at the 2018 New Zealand census, an increase of 171 people (10.2%) since the 2013 census, and an increase of 90 people (5.1%) since the 2006 census. There were 687 households, comprising 948 males and 897 females, giving a sex ratio of 1.06 males per female. The median age was 44.8 years (compared with 37.4 years nationally), with 360 people (19.5%) aged under 15 years, 270 (14.6%) aged 15 to 29, 915 (49.6%) aged 30 to 64, and 303 (16.4%) aged 65 or older.

Ethnicities were 87.6% European/Pākehā, 21.5% Māori, 2.6% Pacific peoples, 2.4% Asian, and 2.1% other ethnicities. People may identify with more than one ethnicity.

The percentage of people born overseas was 10.2, compared with 27.1% nationally.

Although some people chose not to answer the census's question about religious affiliation, 57.2% had no religion, 28.3% were Christian, 2.4% had Māori religious beliefs, 0.2% were Hindu, 0.3% were Muslim, 0.8% were Buddhist and 2.3% had other religions.

Of those at least 15 years old, 153 (10.3%) people had a bachelor's or higher degree, and 408 (27.5%) people had no formal qualifications. The median income was $30,300, compared with $31,800 nationally. 171 people (11.5%) earned over $70,000 compared to 17.2% nationally. The employment status of those at least 15 was that 711 (47.9%) people were employed full-time, 276 (18.6%) were part-time, and 48 (3.2%) were unemployed.

History

Early history
The west bank of the Ohinemuri River, west of Paeroa, was the site of Te Raupa pā, Opita pā and Waiwhau pā, settled around the junction of the Waihou and Ohinemuri Rivers (originally due west of Paeroa). Te Raupa in particular was a heavily settled pā, likely settled between 1450 and 1500. The area was settled almost consistently until European contact, except for a brief period of river flooding. The area was originally settled by Ngāti Hako, and by Ngāti Tamaterā from the 1600s.

Captain James Cook explored the Waihou River in 1779, taking a long-boat up as far as Netherton, just a couple of miles from where the town of Paeroa was built 100 years on. Samuel Marsden visited Raupa settlement in June 1820 for missionary work, and was impressed by the scale of wooden buildings he saw, and the number of people who settled in the area. During the Musket Wars, Ngāpuhi attacked the settlements in December 1821. Raupa was successfully defended, however the residents soon sought refuge in the Waikato. In 1830, Ngāti Tamaterā returned to the area after the Battle of Taumatawiwi, however settled further south than the original settlements, and used Te Raupa as a burial site until the 1850s, when the iwi converted to Christianity.

The area was briefly explored in October 1826 by Captain James Herd, in command of the Lambton and the Isabella (or Rosanna). Herd was sent on an exploratory mission by the first organisation to be known as the New Zealand Company and claimed to have bought  of land from local Māori in Hokianga and Manukau.

By 1869, anticipating the rush to the Ohinemuri Goldfields, considerable numbers of miners camped at Cashell’s Landing "Puke".

Development of Paeroa township
In 1870, Asher Cassrels, a Lithuanian, leased the block of land known as Paeroa from Māori. This included Primrose Hill and most of what is now the town centre.

When James Mackay (surveyor) and Sir David McLean (Minister of Mines) completed negotiations six years later with the Māori Chiefs, Tukukino and Taraia, the fields were declared open. Six hundred miners rushed to Karangahake, considered to be the El Dorado, on 3 March 1875. A canvas town of 1,600 people with about 20 stores and grog shops set the area going. The big gold reefs like Talisman and Crown were discovered but proved hard to work. Heavy machinery required for hard quartz mining had to be brought via the Waihou River and up to Paeroa. The river was the only highway and with two shipping companies in operation, Paeroa became a thriving transport and distribution centre.

A busy freight business developed with four ships regularly running from Auckland to Thames to Paeroa.

The Thames Branch railway line reached the town in 1881 at the Paeroa Railway Station, and gradually ships gave way to steam, which in turn gave way to road transport. Work on the Paeroa–Pokeno Line commenced in the 1930s, but little was done and the proposal was abandoned.

A historic Paeroa  building, in the town centre, is the former National Bank of New Zealand's gold refinery, built in 1914 in Willoughby Street. The building is now a private home and business, hidden from street level view by a ponga fence.

In the early 1900s, the Waihou River near Paeroa was straightened by making a canal, in order to protect farmland from flooding. By February, 1914, a Ferro-cement building , with an iron roof and a  smokestack was completed. Inside was the main refining chamber, two assay offices, weighing room, accounting room, engine and dynamo rooms, two officers' bedrooms, sitting room and bathroom. Detached from the main building was a store room and coal bin.

Modern history

As late as 1928, the Waihou River was still navigable for larger ships all the way up to the town, and the Kopu Bridge was therefore constructed as a swing bridge.

When Brenan and Company, the largest horse and wagon operator, moved to trucking, they bought out the steamship company and named their trucks after the ships that plied the Ohinemuri River. Waimarie and Taniwha were always painted on the new International or Ford trucks that came into their fleet. When transport operator Sarjant’s amalgamated with Brenan, a large truck centre evolved in Paeroa.

As the passenger rail service dwindled, Paeroa eventually lost its railway, so much of the town had its beginnings in supply and transport to the Hauraki and District. The swings of time have enabled the town to boom and revert a number of times.

Culture

Lemon & Paeroa 

Paeroa is best known for the soft drink Lemon & Paeroa (L&P) that used to be produced in the town. The soft drink was made with lemon and carbonated mineral water from Paeroa. Today L&P is owned by Coca-Cola and produced on the same production line as other Coca-Cola products sold in New Zealand.
 
A large L&P bottle stands on the main road as a landmark in the town of Paeroa. In 1994 L&P ran a series of advertisements based around Paeroa, the advert had locals standing in front of various parts of the town pointing out what the town isn't famous for. In one advertisement, a local stands in front a 1930s bungalow making the comment, "It's not famous for its Hollywood mansions". Landmarks and features in the town included the towns Harbour Bridge (a small single lane bridge), bright lights (a flashing chemist sign), luxury hotels (a local motel), trendy shops (an Op Shop) and Opera House (the back of the local town hall).

At the end of each advert a group of people would end by saying "But it is famous" pointing to the landmark L&P bottle in the background. The advert would end with the tag line L&P World Famous in New Zealand. There were 3 separate advertisements all using the song Counting the Beat by The Swingers.

Events

Paeroa is known as the Events Capital of the Coromandel, as well as having a national reputation for horse racing. February is a busy event month in Paeroa and the motorcycle race ‘Battle of the Streets’ and ‘Pipe Band Tattoo’ events both attract participants and crowds from all over New Zealand and overseas.

The horse track was closed in 2014 due to financial issues with the managers of the track..

Marae

Two marae (tribal meeting grounds) of the Ngāti Tamaterā are located in Paeroa: Taharua and Te Pai o Hauraki. Each has a wharenui meeting house of the same name.

Sports
The Thames Valley Rugby Union are based in the Paeroa, and compete in the Heartland Championship. Several amateur sports clubs are also based in the town. These include clubs for rugby, soccer, netball, cricket, tennis, bowls and golf.

Education

The College opened on 5 February 1958, and replaced the Paeroa District High School which had operated from 1902.

Paeroa has five other schools:
 Goldfields School is a special school and area resource centre, which has students aged from 5 to 21 years old.
The school was established in 1900.
The school was established in 1987 with the support of local evangelical churches.

References

External links
 Ex-National Bank Gold Refinery Photo Gallery
 Paeroa College website

Populated places in Waikato
Hauraki District